1001 Spikes is a platform game developed by 8bits Fanatics and Nicalis, and published by Nicalis. Originally named Aban Hawkins & the 1000 Spikes, the game's objective is to escape a vast terrain and struggle to reach for victory without being impaled by spikes and many other disasters. Throughout the multiple travels, the game gets increasingly challenging, especially having to dodge falling stones and much more.

Plot
Jim Hawkins, a world-renowned archaeologist, has been lost within the frozen tundra of Antarctica. Before his disappearance, his daughter Tina is left with a map to the forgotten ruins of South America. Together with her estranged brother Aban, they explore the temple and try to retrieve their father's legacy.

Reception

1001 Spikes received positive reviews. Aggregating review website Metacritic gave the Wii U version 83/100 based on 6 reviews, the PlayStation 4 version 78/100 based on 8 reviews, the Microsoft Windows version 80/100 based on 4 reviews, the 3DS version 73/100 based on 4 reviews, and the PlayStation Vita version 81/100 based on 4 reviews.

IGN gave the game an 8/10, favoring its abundance of content and exhilarating disasters, while showing disappointment of the increasing repetition of the game as the levels advance.

References

2014 video games
Side-scrolling platform games
Indie video games
Video games developed in the United States
Nintendo 3DS eShop games
Wii U eShop games
PlayStation 4 games
PlayStation Network games
PlayStation Vita games
Xbox One games
Windows games
MacOS games
Linux games
Multiplayer and single-player video games
Nicalis games